Ethanedithiol may refer to:

 1,1-Ethanedithiol
 1,2-Ethanedithiol